Abelater is a genus of click beetles, family Elateridae.

Species
There are at least extant 32 species:

There is also one prehistoric species known from Baltic amber:

See also
 List of click beetles of India

References 

Elateridae genera
Beetles of Asia